Clifford Ann Creed (born September 23, 1938) is a retired American professional golfer. She became a member of the LPGA Tour in 1963 and won eleven LPGA Tour events in all.

Amateur career
Creed was born in Alexandria, Louisiana, and started playing golf at age 11. She graduated from Lamar Tech in 1960 with a degree in physical education. She won the Louisiana State Women's Amateur six times between 1955 and 1961, and won the Western Junior in 1956. In 1962, she won the North and South Women's Amateur, the South Atlantic Amateur and was a member of the United States Curtis Cup team. She is a former Louisiana Sports Athlete of the Year.

Professional career
Creed turned professional in 1962. She joined the LPGA Tour in 1963 and earned LPGA Rookie of the Year honors. She won 11 times on tour between 1964 and 1967. Her best finish in a major championship was second in the 1965 LPGA Championship. She finished in the top ten on the money list six times between 1963 and 1968, with her best finish being fourth place in 1965.

Creed was elected to Louisiana Sports Hall of Fame in 1985.

Professional wins (12)

LPGA Tour wins (11)

LPGA Tour playoff record (1–3)

Other wins (1)
1967 Yankee Ladies' Team Championship (with Margie Masters)

Team appearances
Amateur
Curtis Cup (representing the United States): 1962 (winners)

See also
List of golfers with most LPGA Tour wins

References

External links

American female golfers
Lamar Lady Cardinals golfers
LPGA Tour golfers
Golfers from Louisiana
Sportspeople from Alexandria, Louisiana
1938 births
Living people